John Edgar Gould (1821-1875) was a composer and publisher of hymns. He was born in Bangor, Maine and died in Algiers, Algeria while traveling.

Gould managed music stores in New York and Philadelphia (where he lived), and collaborated with composer William Fischer. Gould's published collections of hymns include:

The Modern Harp, 1846
The Wreath of School Songs, 1847
The Tyrolian Lyre, 1847
The Sunday School Lute, 1848
Harmonia Sacra, 1851
Songs of Gladness for the Sabbath School (Philadelphia, Pennsylvania: Garrigues Brothers, 1869)

He was best known for composing the tune to the popular "Jesus, Savior, Pilot Me", whose text was written by Edward Hopper.

References

Hughes, Charles William. American Hymns Old and New: Notes on the Hymns and Biographies of the Authors and Composers. New York: Columbia University Press, 1980.
"John Edgar Gould", Hymntime
Hymn Studies Blog, Aug. 30, 2008

1821 births
American male composers
American composers
Musicians from Bangor, Maine
1875 deaths
American Christian hymnwriters
Musicians from Maine
19th-century American writers
19th-century American musicians
Songwriters from Maine
19th-century American male musicians
American male songwriters